The Little Blue River is the name of several rivers:

Little Blue River (Indiana), a tributary of Big Blue River (Indiana)
Little Blue River (Kansas/Nebraska)
Little Blue River (Missouri)

See also
Big Blue River (disambiguation)
Blue River (disambiguation)